The Sioux City Explorers are a professional minor league baseball team based in Sioux City, Iowa, in the United States. The Explorers are members American Association of Professional Baseball, an official Partner League of Major League Baseball. Since their inception in 1993, the Explorers have played their home games at Lewis and Clark Park.

The Explorers, frequently called the X's, have played in the American Association since 2006. Previously, they were members of the Northern League.

Season-by-season records

Playoffs
1994 season: Lost to Winnipeg 3–1 in championship
1999 season: Lost to Winnipeg 3–0 in semifinals
2002 season: Defeated Joliet 3–2 in quarterfinals; lost to Winnipeg 3–1 in semifinals
2008 season: Lost to Sioux Falls 3–0 in semifinals
2015 season: Defeated St. Paul 3–1 in semifinals; lost to Laredo 3–1 in championship
2016 season: Lost to Wichita 3–1 in semifinals
2018 season: Lost to Kansas City 3–2 in semifinals
2019 season: Defeated Kansas City 3–1 in semifinals; lost to St. Paul 3–0 in championship
2021 season: Defeated Cleburne in Wildcard game; lost to Kansas City 3-0 in Division Series

Roster

Notable alumni
 Joe Kraemer (1993-1994)
 Oil Can Boyd (1994-1995)
 Carl Nichols (1995)
 Gerald Young (1995-1996)
 Dana Williams (1996)
 Julius Matos (1997)
 Danny Perez (1997)
 Mike Porzio (1997)
 Matt Turner (1997)
 Nate Bland (2000)
 Mike Busby (2000)
 Nate Field (2000)
 Brent Bowers (2001)
 Jeff Juden (2001)
 John LeRoy (2001)
 Cris Colón (2002)
 Trey Beamon (2003)
 Mike Figga (2003)
 José Malavé (2003)
 Desi Wilson (2003-2004)
 Allan Simpson (2007)
 Charlton Jimerson (2008)
 Walter Young (2008-2009)
 Steve Andrade (2009)
 Jacob Cruz (2010)
 T. J. Bohn (2010-2011)
 Emiliano Fruto (2011)
 John Holdzkom (2013)
 Alex Burnett (2014)
 Jesse English (2014)
 Brock Kjeldgaard (2014-2015)
 Rene Tosoni (2014-2015)
 Ryan Court (2015)
 John Ely (2015)
 David Herndon (2015)
 Jeff Marquez (2015)
 Tommy Mendonca (2014-2016)
 Derrick Robinson (2016)
 Tayler Scott (2016)
 Tony Campana (2017)
 John Nogowski (2017)
Bubby Rossman (2017)
 Josh Vitters (2017)
 Alex White (2017)
 Luis Durango (2018)
 Dean Green (2018-2019)
 Anthony Bender (2019)
 Jason Garcia (2019)
 Jeremy Hazelbaker (2019)
 Taylor Jordan (2019)

References

External links

American Association of Professional Baseball teams
Northern League (baseball, 1993–2010) teams
Sports in Sioux City, Iowa
Professional baseball teams in Iowa